Santiago Carreras (born 30 March 1998) is an Argentine rugby union player who plays for Gloucester. On 28 December 2018, Carreras was named in the Jaguares squad for the 2019 Super Rugby season. His playing positions are Fullback, Wing and Fly-half.

Carreras was a starter for the  national team on 14 November 2020 in their first ever win against the All Blacks.

Despite sharing the same last name as Mateo Carreras of Newcastle and playing in a common position, the players are not related. Santiago Carreras is from Córdoba; Mateo Carreras is from Tucumán

References

External links
 

Jaguares (Super Rugby) players
Gloucester Rugby players
Rugby union fullbacks
Rugby union wings
Rugby union fly-halves
Argentine rugby union players
Argentina international rugby union players
Sportspeople from Córdoba, Argentina
1998 births
Living people